Suislepa is a village in Viljandi Parish, Viljandi County, Estonia. Until the 2017 administrative reform of Estonian municipalities the village was located in Tarvastu Parish.The population as of 2014 was 305 people. It is 42 km (26 miles) southeast of the town of Viljandi, near the southern coast of Võrtsjärv lake.

History
The village of Suislepa is located near the Õhne river (also called the Suislepa, Omuli, and Omeli river), first mentioned in 1478 in the German chronicles Omelsche Hecke by Baltic German settlers. In the 17th century, German nobles Jürgen Schütte Bultler and Franz Scutten began implementing the construction of a large manor in Suislepa. The estate went through a succession of owners until it fell into ruin in the early 19th century. In 1805, Major Karl Gustav von Krüdener Moritz, the son of German Baron von Mengden, began construction on the new Suislepa manor house and outbuildings. The new mansion was located high on the left bank of the Õhne river and was completed in 1811. After nationalization by the Soviet authorities in 1940, the manor became a school for many years. Today, the main manor house is home to a kindergarten and a library. The manor also has a plaque dedicated to the victims of the Great Famine of Estonia, which killed approximately a fifth of Estonian and Livonian population (70,000–75,000 people) from 1695 to 1697.

The name of Suislepa is familiar to many Estonians thanks to the Suislepa apple cultivar which originates from the orchard of the older manor. A commemorative stone now marks the place where the parent tree of the popular cultivar once grew.

Suislepa was once home to Suislepa Airfield (also known as Obriku Airfield), a Soviet era military airbase used mainly in the 1960s as a frontline bomber airfield. The airfield has since been disassembled and abandoned.

Every June the village holds the Suislepa Boat Day, a celebration that includes boat races, live music and other festivities.

Gallery

References

External links 
 Non-profit association Suislepa Paadiselts

Villages in Viljandi County
Kreis Fellin